Lamine Diane (born November 7, 1997) is a Senegalese professional basketball player who last played for the Delaware Blue Coats of the NBA G League. He played college basketball for the Cal State Northridge Matadors. He was named the Big West Player of the Year in both 2019 and 2020.

High school and college career
Diane, the son of Senegal national team player Keletigui Diane, first began playing basketball at the age of nine, though he was initially more interested in soccer. He came to the United States in 2015 to play high school basketball at Findlay Prep in Henderson, Nevada. He came into his own in his second season as he tripled his scoring average from 5 to 16 points per game. He committed to Cal State Northridge, redshirting the 2017–18 season to concentrate on academics and to allow a wrist injury to heal. As a redshirt freshman, Diane averaged 24.8 points, 11.2 rebounds and 2.2 blocked shots per game and led the nation in field goals.  At the close of the season became the first player in history to win the Big West Conference's Player, Freshman and Newcomer of the Year awards in the same year.

For his sophomore season, Diane was named to the preseason All-Big West team. However, he was ruled academically ineligible for the first semester by the NCAA. At the close of the regular season, Diane was awarded his second straight conference Player of the Year honor. He averaged 25.6 points, 10.2 rebounds, two blocks and 1.7 steals per game. Following the season Diane declared for the 2020 NBA draft.

Professional career

Delaware Blue Coats (2021–2022)
On December 3, 2020, Diane signed with the Philadelphia 76ers. On December 7, he was waived by the 76ers. He was then added to the roster of the 76ers' NBA G League affiliate, the Delaware Blue Coats, making his debut on February 11, 2021 and scoring three points, blocking two shots and pulling down two rebounds. On October 25, he re-signed with Delaware. On February 3, 2022, Diane was ruled out for the season with a shoulder injury.

References

External links
 Cal State Northridge Matadors bio
 College statistics at Sports-Reference.com

1997 births
Living people
Basketball players from Dakar
Cal State Northridge Matadors men's basketball players
Delaware Blue Coats players
Findlay Prep alumni
Power forwards (basketball)
Senegalese expatriate basketball people in the United States
Senegalese men's basketball players
Small forwards